This is a list of Christian religious houses, both dissolved and extant, in Brandenburg in Germany, including Berlin. Extant religious houses are marked in bold.

Brandenburg

A
 Alexanderdorf Abbey (Kloster Alexanderdorf or Abtei St. Gertrud), Alexanderdorf in Am Mellensee: Benedictine nuns (extant from 1934)
 Altfriedland Abbey, see Friedland
 Angermünde Friary (Kloster Angermünde), Angermünde: Franciscan friars (second half of the 13th century-1543)

B
 Boitzenburg Abbey (Kloster Boitzenburg), Boitzenburg: Cistercian nuns (1271–1538; the former Benedictine nunnery Marienpforte was merged into the new foundation by 1281)
 Brandenburg an der Havel:
 Dominican or St. Paul's Friary (Paulikloster): Dominican friars (1286-c1540)
 Franciscan or St. John's Friary (Franziskanerkloster, Brandenburg): Franciscan friars (moved here from Ziesar; 1237-1538x1544)

C
 Chorin Abbey (Kloster Chorin), Chorin: Cistercian monks (1248–1542)
 Cottbus Friary (Kloster Cottbus), Cottbus: Franciscan friars (1290x1300-1537)

D
 Dobrilugk Abbey (Kloster Dobrilugk), Doberlug-Kirchhain: Cistercian monks (1165x1184-1541)

F
 Frankfurt Charterhouse (Kartäuserkloster Frankfurt/Oder), Frankfurt an der Oder: Carthusian monks (1396–1540)
 Franziskushof, see Zehdenick
 Friedland Abbey (Kloster Friedland), Altfriedland, Neuhardenberg: Cistercian nuns (1230–1540)

G
 Gramzow Abbey (Kloster Gramzow), Gramzow: Premonstratensian canons (c.1178-Reformation)

H
 Heiligengrabe Abbey (Kloster Stift zum Heiligengrabe), Heiligengrabe: Cistercian nuns (1287–1548); women's collegiate foundation, or Damenstift, and school (1549–1945); community of deaconesses (1946–1995); re-establishment of Stift under a new abbess (extant from 1996)
 Himmelpfort Abbey (Kloster Himmelpfort), Himmelpfort: Cistercian monks (1299–1541)

J
 Jüterbog:
 Jüterbog Friary (Franziskanerkloster Jüterbog): Franciscan friars (third quarter of the 15th century-c1560)
 Jüterbog Priory (Kloster Jüterbog): Cistercian nuns (1282-c.1540)

K
 Kyritz Friary (Franziskanerkloster Kyritz), Kyritz: Franciscan friars (c.1225[?]-1552)

L
 Lehnin Abbey (Kloster Lehnin), Kloster Lehnin: Cistercian monks (1180–1542); premises used for the establishment of the Luise-Henrietten-Stift for Protestant deaconesses (1911–1942; re-founded 2004)
 Lindow Abbey (Kloster Lindow), Lindow: Cistercian nuns (c.1290-1542); Protestant women's collegiate foundation, or Damenstift (1542–1638)
 Luise-Henrietten-Stift, see LehninM
 Marienfliess Abbey (Kloster Marienfliess), Stepenitz in Marienfliess, in the Prignitz: Cistercian nuns (1231–1544); Protestant women's collegiate foundation, or Damenstift, later deaconesses (extant from 1544)
 Marienpforte Priory or Abbey (Kloster Marienpforte), near Flieth and Stegelitz: Benedictine nuns (1269; by 1281 had been merged into the new Cistercian foundation at Boitzenburg)
 Marienstern Abbey (Kloster Marienstern, formerly also Kloster Güldenstern), Mühlberg: Cistercian nuns (1228–1539); Claretians (extant from 2000)
 Marienwerder, see SeehausenN
 Neuzelle Abbey (Kloster Neuzelle), Neuzelle: Cistercian monks (1268–1817)

S
 St. John's, Brandenburg, see Brandenburg an der Havel St. Paul's, Brandenburg, see Brandenburg an der Havel Seehausen Priory or Abbey (Kloster Seehausen or Kloster Marienwerder), Seehausen: Cistercian nuns (c.1239 x 1250 - 1543/44)
 Stepenitz, see MarienfliessZ
 Zehdenick:
 Franziskushof: Franciscan friars (extant from 1993)
 Zehdenick Abbey (Kloster Zehdenick), Zehdenick: Cistercian nuns (c.1250-1540); Protestant  women's collegiate foundation (1540–1945)
 Ziesar:
 Ziesar Friary (Franziskanerkloster Ziesar): Franciscan friars (c.1226-1271; moved to Brandenburg an der Havel)
 Ziesar Priory (Zisterzierinnenkloster Ziesar): Cistercian nuns (c.1330-1540); Protestant women's collegiate foundation, or Damenstift (1540–1610)
 Zinna Abbey (Kloster Zinna), Jüterbog: Cistercian monks (1170–1553)

Berlin
 Berlin:
 Greyfriars, Berlin (Graues Kloster, Berlin): Franciscan friars (probably 1249-Reformation)
 Regina Martyrum Carmel (Karmel Regina Martyrum): Discalced Carmelite nuns (extant from 1982)

See also
List of Christian monasteries in Mecklenburg-Vorpommern
List of Christian monasteries in North Rhine-Westphalia
List of Christian monasteries in Saxony
List of Christian monasteries in Saxony-Anhalt
List of Christian monasteries in Schleswig-Holstein

Notes

References
 Dehio, G., edited by Gerhard Vinken, et al., 2000: Handbuch der deutschen Kunstdenkmäler: Bd. Brandenburg. Deutscher Kunstverlag München/Berlin. 
 Gooß, G., Jaqueline Hennig, J. (eds.), 1997: Alle Brandenburger Zisterzienserklöster. Marianne-Verlag. 
 Heimann, H.-D., Neitmann, K., Schich, W., Bauch, M., Franke, E., Gahlbeck, Chr., Popp, Chr., Riedel, P. (eds.), 2007: Brandenburgisches Klosterbuch: Handbuch der Klöster, Stifte und Kommenden bis zur Mitte des 16. Jahrhunderts (Brandenburgische Historische Studien). Be.Bra Wissenschaftsverlag 
 Schumann, Dirk, 2006: Dorfkirchen zwischen Klosterarchitektur und Wallfahrtslandschaft, in: Offene Kirchen 2006''. Förderkreis Alte Kirchen Berlin-Brandenburg e.V., Berlin.

Sources and external links
 Zisterzienser in Brandenburg 

Brandenburg
 
Brandenburg-related lists